Minoo Mumtaz (born as Malikunnisa Ali; 26 April 1942 – 23 October 2021) was an Indian actress. She was the sister of India's ace comedian Mehmood and was part of the Mehmood Ali film family. Minoo Mumtaz appeared in many Hindi films of the 1950s and 1960s, mostly as a dancer and character actress.

Early life
Born in a family of four brothers and four sisters to Mumtaz Ali, who was famous as a dancer and character-artist in films from the 1940s era, with his own dance troupe "Mumtaz Ali Nites". Mumtaz Ali's career slumped due to his excessive drinking and his family fell on hard times, leading to his son Mehmood working as a child artist, and daughter Minoo Mumtaz to work as dancer in his stage shows and later in movies.

Career

She was renamed as "Minoo" by none other than Meena Kumari, who is the sister-in-law of Mehmood. She started off as a stage dancer and later as dancer in many films of the 50s  and 60s with her first film Sakhi Hateem. She also played the lead role opposite Balraj Sahni in Black Cat (1959). She can be seen in the song "Boojh Mera Kya Naam Re", from the movie C.I.D. (1956), as Dancer in Howrah Bridge (1958). She also appeared in Guru Dutt films such as Kaagaz Ke Phool (1959), Chaudhvin Ka Chand (1960) and Sahib Bibi Aur Ghulam (1962). She played key roles in Yahudi (1958), Taj Mahal (1963), Ghunghat (1960), Gharana (1961), Insan Jaag Utha (1959), Ghar Basake Dekho (1963), Gazal (1964), Sindbad, Alibaba, Aladdin, Jahan Ara (1964). 1958 film Howrah Bridge created a huge controversy because in this movie Minoo Mumtaz was seen making onscreen romance with Mehmood who was her real blood brother. People were shocked to see the brother-sister in romantic role.

Personal life
She married S. Ali Akbar, a film director on 12 June 1963. The couple had three daughters and a son. Minoo Mumtaz died on 23 October 2021 at the age of 79. She lived her last days in Canada.

Filmography

Television

See also 
 Mehmood Ali Family
 Mumtaz Ali
 Mehmood Ali
 Anwar Ali
 Lucky Ali
 List of Hindi film clans

References

Further reading 
 Zaveri, Hanif. Mehmood, a Man of Many Moods, Popular Prakashan, 2005.

External links
 

Indian film actresses
Actresses in Hindi cinema
1942 births
2021 deaths
Actresses from Mumbai
Indian emigrants to Canada
20th-century Indian actresses